The American Musical and Dramatic Academy (AMDA) is a private conservatory for the performing arts in New York City and Los Angeles, California. The conservatory offers both Bachelor of Fine Arts degrees and two-year certificates in professional performance. Programs are offered in acting, musical theatre, dance, and performing arts. It is accredited by the National Association of Schools of Theatre.

History
AMDA was founded in 1964 by Philip Burton and the New York theatre community. By 1970, the school had outgrown its original location on East 23rd Street and moved into a new building on Bleecker Street in Greenwich Village. A few years later, further growth prompted a move to the Ansonia Building. In the 1990s a second location, which is now the principal location of AMDA New York, was opened near Lincoln Center.

In 2003 the school expanded west by opening AMDA Los Angeles in the Vine Tower Building.  AMDA is a Bachelor of Fine Arts (BFA) granting performing arts college with campuses in both New York and Los Angeles.

Campuses
The New York City campus is located on the Upper West Side of Manhattan. The principal facility is located at 211 West 61st Street, directly behind Lincoln Center. The other half of the campus is located at the Ansonia building, on West 73rd Street. 

The Los Angeles campus is located in the Hollywood Entertainment District, with its principal facility in the Vine Tower Building. 

AMDA's Los Angeles campus features four main theatres for learning, skill development and performance including a black box theatre, two laboratory theatres, and an outdoor amphitheater.  Other facilities include rehearsal space, film, TV and editing facilities, library, the AMDA Café, and the campus piazza.

Notable alumni
Nina Arianda
Nicole Byer
Tyne Daly
Bailey De Young
Jason Derulo
Asia Kate Dillon
Erik Estrada
Mike Faist
Jesse Tyler Ferguson
Brita Filter
Ray Fisher
Adam Grace
Christopher Jackson
Amy Jo Johnson
Neil Kaplan
Hailey Kilgore
Caissie Levy
Rizwan Manji
Carolyne Mas
Gretchen Mol
Janelle Monáe
Anthony Ramos
Paul Sorvino
Lee Tergesen
Becca Tobin
Michelle Visage
Marissa Jaret Winokur
Michael-Leon Wooley
Natalie Zea
Adonis Kapsalis

References

External links

Drama schools in the United States
Universities and colleges in New York City
Educational institutions established in 1964
Universities and colleges in Los Angeles
Universities and colleges in Manhattan
Hollywood, Los Angeles
1964 establishments in New York City
Theatre in Los Angeles
Theatre in New York City
Private universities and colleges in California